Felix Field and Loker Stadium is an outdoor track and field facility located on the campus of the University of Southern California in Los Angeles.  The facility, rebuilt in 2001, serves as the outdoor home of the USC Trojans men's and women's track and field teams. The stadium has a seating capacity of 3,000. The stadium is named for Katherine B. Loker and the field is named for USC alumnae and US Olympian Allyson Felix. The entrance to the facility is called "Louis Zamperini Plaza" and includes tributes to USC's NCAA and Olympic champions.

Renovations
Felix Field and Loker Stadium both underwent renovations in the winter of 2012–2013. The track and the infield were replaced and the exterior of the stadium was renovated.

Events
During the 1984 Summer Olympics, the facility served as the training track at the USC Olympic Village and the warm-up track for the track and field competition. The facility hosted the PAC-10 conference championship meet in 2003 and PAC-12 conference championship meet in 2013. The 2015 Special Olympics World Summer Games were held at the facility.

Gallery

See also
USC Trojans

References

External links
Cromwell Field and Loker Stadium at usctrojans.com

Athletics (track and field) venues in Los Angeles
College track and field venues in the United States
USC Trojans sports venues
Venues of the 1984 Summer Olympics
Sports venues completed in 2001
2001 establishments in California